New Sweden, previously South Australia,  is an Australian 12 metre class yacht. It was by designed by Ben Lexcen and built by Steve E. Ward.

Career
South Australia competed in the 1987 Defender Selection Series, helmed by Phil Thompson.

New Sweden competed in the 1988 12-metre World Championships against Bengal III, Crusader, Kookaburra III, Nordstjernan, and Steak'n Kidney.

It appeared in the 1988 Swedish film S.O.S. – En segelsällskapsresa.

References

12-metre class yachts
Sailing yachts built in Australia
Sailing yachts designed by Ben Lexcen
1980s sailing yachts
Sailing yachts of Sweden
Sailing yachts of Australia
Citizen Cup yachts
1987 ships